Joav BarEl (also written Yoav Bar-El), (1933–1977) was an Israeli artist, critic, and lecturer.

He was an influential figure in Israel's contemporary art scene during the 1960s and 70s.

Biography 
Joav BarEl was born on January 28, 1933, in Tel Aviv, Mandatory Palestine, to Aharon (“Aharonchik”) Elkind and Shlomit Cohen Tzedek. He had a younger sister, Mirana Barel-Blay (b. 1939), and a younger half-brother, Joel BarEl, from his father's second marriage. His father was a well-known lifeguard at Tel Aviv's beaches, and his mother was among the founders of HaBima Theater and infused a love of culture, art and literature into Joav and his sister, Mirana. In his early life, inspired by his father, BarEl practiced diving and fishing. His interest in music was also evident from a young age, and he began playing the accordion in his teens.

In his senior year of high school, BarEl enrolled in a training program of the IDF Air Force, in which he studied aircraft mechanics in the US. He served as a maintenance officer in the Air Force and later held the same position in TWA for a few years. During his training in the US, BarEl attended lectures given by the composer Arnold Schoenberg. After completing his military service, he was admitted to study composition and conducting but did not complete his training. Nevertheless, he maintained his interest in classical, popular, and avant-garde music throughout his life.

In 1954, BarEl began art studies at The Avni Institute of Art and Design and moved into a studio in Tel Aviv that doubled as his home. His studio, and the café he frequented, became a gathering place for artists, poets, and writers, among them David Avidan, Yair Hurvitz, Aviva Uri, Prof. Gabriel Moked, Prof. Menachem Peri, Yona Wallach, Jacques Mory-Katmor, Ami Shavit, Benni Efrat, and others.

From 1964 to 1968, BarEl studied psychology and philosophy at Tel Aviv University, focusing on aesthetics and psychology in art. Subsequently, he began a master's degree in clinical psychology, graduating in 1969.

He was interested in Eastern philosophy, primarily in Zen-Buddhism, and in Japanese calligraphy and meditation. He was also an enthusiastic reader of science fiction and was generally interested in altered states of consciousness, which led to his participation in studies on psychedelic drugs conducted at the time by the Ministry of Health.

Artistic practice 
BarEl's early artistic practice was influenced by European abstract art. His range of works was broad and eclectic, encompassing expressionist oil paintings, a series of paintings and drawings on paper inspired by Franz Kafka’s stories (1958–1960), abstract stone and plaster reliefs, and zen-inspired ink drawings.

Later in his career, between 1967 and 1970, BarEl produced acrylic paintings, collages, and photographic transfer works influenced by American pop art, using magazine photographs and advertisements as his source. In those paintings, BarEl used industrial spray paint and bright complementary colors. His painting Kennedy Assassination, 1968, was first shown at the "Political" exhibition organized by the 10+ Group in Tel Aviv and received critical responses due to its overtly political nature. It was later shown at the Israeli gallery Tempo Rubato (2014) and was included in the Tate Modern exhibition "The World Goes Pop" in 2015–2016.

BarEl was also one of the first practitioners of conceptual art in Israel. Starting in 1969, he produced conceptual sculptural works and kept a “Book of Ideas”—a notebook in which he wrote suggestions for different artworks he invited fellow artists to execute; he also realized some of those ideas himself.

Writing and teaching 
Alongside his own artistic endeavors, BarEl was active as an art critic and lecturer and had a profound impact on future generations of Israeli artists.

In 1959, BarEl began publishing articles and reviews in Israel's most important platforms. He was the art critic for the daily newspapers Yedioth Ahronoth (1959–61) and Ha’aretz (1959–69) and for the radio stations Kol Israel (1964–69) and the IDF Radio (1967–71). Between 1965 and 1971, he was the editor of the art section in “Achshav” (“Now”) Magazine.

BarEl also organized and served as an adviser for exhibitions of contemporary Israeli artists, among them the highly influential 10+ Group exhibitions. The 10+ Group, led by Raffi Lavie, was a gathering of young artists who wished to “shake up” what they saw as a stagnant Israeli art scene at the time, which was dominated by the lyrical abstraction of the New Horizons group. Their guiding principle was the idea of “doing things differently,” by aiming to transcend the artists’ individual styles through collaboration and non-conventional exhibitions. In addition to his participation in some of the group's exhibitions, BarEl promoted their agenda in his writings.

In addition, BarEl served as an artistic advisor to The Israeli Television, the public TV network, for the weekly culture magazine “Kla’im” (1969–1970), and for several educational films about art and culture, for which he also wrote some of the scripts (1970–1972). Another influential position he held was as a teacher in the Technion – Israel Institute of Technology, Haifa, where between 1971 and 1977 he taught three-dimensional design in the Department of Architecture and Town Planning, in collaboration with Yitzhak Danziger.

Legacy 
Joav BarEl died of heart disease in 1977, at the age of 44.

A collection of the artist's work is held at the Information Center for Israeli Art in the Israel Museum, Jerusalem, and at the BarEl-Baly family collections.

In October 2004, the first retrospective exhibition of BarEl's work was held at the Tel Aviv Museum of Art. Alongside the exhibition, the museum published a selection of his critical, pedagogical, and theoretical writings in the book Between Sobriety and Innocence – On Plastic Arts in the 1960s in Tel Aviv (2004).

BarEl was involved in several important and influential initiatives in the contemporary Israeli art scene, and had planned to establish a fund for the research and development of contemporary art. His idea inspired the establishment of the Mevo’ot Fund in 2021. The fund was initiated by Joel BarEl, Mirana BarEl (Joav's sister) and her husband Ami Blay, and their close friend Ami Steinitz, as well as by Shiraz Grinbaum-BarEl and Michal Vaknin. The fund seeks to promote contemporary artistic actions inspired by BarEl's life work, to promote diverse spaces for discourse about and with art, and to make BarEl's work accessible for future generations.

Teaching 

 1962–1963 Avni Institute of Art and Design in Tel Aviv
 1965 Seminar for high school art supervisors, Ministry of Education, Jerusalem, Israel
 1966 Tel Aviv University, seminar on the “Concept of Art“
 1967 Advanced seminar for art teachers, Ministry of Education, Tel Aviv, Israel
 1967–1971 Margoshilski School for Drawing, Tel Aviv
 1970 Seminar on “Concept of Art“ for kibbutz artists, Petakh Tikva, Israel
 1971–1977 Technion – Israel Institute of Technology, Haifa; Three-dimensional design in the Department of Architecture and Town Planning

Solo exhibitions 

 1958 Chemerinsky Gallery, Tel Aviv, Israel
 1960 Chemerinsky Gallery, Tel Aviv, Israel
 1969 Gordon Gallery, Tel Aviv, Israel
1981 Memory Exhibition, Shinar Gallery, Tel Aviv, Israel
1987 “Joav BarEl,” Kalisher 5 Gallery, Tel Aviv, Israel
2004–2005 “Joav BarEl Retrospective,” curator: Irith Hadar, Tel Aviv Museum of Art, Israel
2012 Drawings for Kafka, Tempo Rubato, Tel Aviv, Israel
2014 “Pop Works,” Tempo Rubato, Tel Aviv, Israel
2014 Joav BarEl, Frieze New York, Frame section, NY, USA  Center of the World, Tempo Rubato, Tel Aviv[2]

Group exhibitions 
 1957 “HaYeled” (The Child), Zuta Gallery, Tel Aviv, Israel
 1958 “The Art of Tomorrow,” Haifa Museum of Art, Israel
 1959 “Young Artists,” Artists’ Association, Tel Aviv, Israel
“First Biennale of Young Artists,” Paris, France

“The Bonfire Club,” Tel Aviv
1961 “Spring Exhibition,” Rina Gallery, Jerusalem, Israel
“Fall Exhibition,” Rina Gallery, Jerusalem, Israel

Yehudit Gallery, Tel Aviv, Israel
 1964 “Five Artists,” Rina Gallery, Jerusalem, Israel
“Contemporary Art,“ Beit Katz, Acre, Israel
 1965 “Fall exhibition“, Tel Aviv Museum of Art, Israel
“Five Young Artists,” Hanegev Museum, Beersheba, Israel

“Fall Exhibition,” Malia (Kahana) Gallery, Tel Aviv, Israel

“Drawing 1965” (תשכ"ו), Haifa Museum of Art, Israel
 1966 “Fall exhibition,“ Tel Aviv Museum of Art, Israel
“The Flower,”  10+ Group, Massada Gallery, Tel Aviv, Israel

“Fall Exhibition,” Malia (Kahana) Gallery, Tel Aviv Israel
 1967 “Winter Exhibition,” the Artists and Sculptures Association, Tel Aviv
“In Red,” 10+ Group, Katz Gallery, Tel Aviv, Israel

“Spring Exhibition,” Gordon Gallery, Tel Aviv

“The Nude,” 10+ Group, Gordon Gallery, Tel Aviv, Israel
 1968 “Summer Exhibition,“ Gordon Gallery, Tel Aviv, Israel
“Fall Exhibition“, Tel Aviv Museum of Art, Israel

“Pro and Con,”  10+ Group, 220 Gallery, Tel Aviv

“Artists of Tel Aviv,” Tel Aviv Museum of Art, in collaboration with the Artists’ Association, Israel
 1969 “In a Circle,” 10+ Group, Gordon Gallery, Tel Aviv, Israel
“Stop, Green,“ Artists’ Pavilion, Jerusalem, Israel
 1970 “Five Rooms,“ Artists’ Pavilion, Jerusalem, Israe
A selection of Israeli Art, Gan Ha'em, Haifa, Israel
 1971 Opening exhibition of the new building, Tel Aviv Museum of Art
 1972 “Conceptual Art,” Artists’ Association, Alharizi Pavilion, Tel Aviv, Israel
2015–2016 “The World Goes Pop,” Tate Modern, London, UK

Selected monographs / publications on Joav BarEl 
 1997 Drawings After Kafka, with texts by Ami Steinitz, Yoram Bronowski, Gavriel Moked, Published by Mirana BarEl-Blay and Ami Blay, 
 2004 Joav BarEl, exhibition catalogue, Tel Aviv Museum of Art, Israel, with texts by Mordechai Omer, Gabriel Moked, Irith Hadar, Joav BarEl, Adam Tennenbaum, and a conversation between Rafi Lavie and Yona Fischer, 
 2004 Between Sobriety and Innocence – on Plastic Arts in the 1960s in Tel Aviv, a collection of critical essays by Joav BarEl, edited by Mordechai Omer,

See also
Visual arts in Israel

References

External links 
Mevo’ot - The Joav BarEl Ideas Fund

1933 births
1977 deaths
Israeli art dealers
Israeli artists
Israeli male writers
People from Tel Aviv
Tel Aviv University alumni